A rover is a planetary surface exploration vehicle designed to move across the surface of a planet or other celestial body. Rovers are used to explore, collect information, and take samples of the surface. This is a list of all rovers on extraterrestrial bodies in the Solar System. Since 1970, there have been four lunar rovers (excludes the three Lunar Roving Vehicles on Apollo 15, 16, and 17, as they carried no payloads and were designed to be driven by astronauts on the lunar surface), six Mars rovers, and three asteroid rovers that have successfully landed and explored these extraterrestrial surfaces.

Key
Colour key:

Moon

Mars

Asteroids

Titan

Proposed rovers

Crewed rovers

See also
List of landings on extraterrestrial bodies
List of extraterrestrial orbiters
List of Solar System probes

References

Rovers on extraterrestrial bodies
 List of rovers